Wingstrandarctus is a genus of tardigrades, in the subfamily Florarctinae which is part of the family Halechiniscidae. The genus was named and described by Kristensen in 1984.

Species
The genus includes five species:

 Wingstrandarctus corallinus Kristensen, 1984
 Wingstrandarctus crypticus Renaud-Mornant, 1989
 Wingstrandarctus intermedius (Renaud-Mornant, 1967)
 Wingstrandarctus stinae Jørgensen, Boesgaard, Møbjerg & Kristensen, 2014
 Wingstrandarctus unsculptus Jørgensen, Boesgaard, Møbjerg & Kristensen, 2014

References

Publications
Kristensen, 1984 : On the biology of Wingstrandarctus corallinus nov. gen. et spec., with notes on the symbiotic bacteria in the subfamily Florarctinae (Arthrotardigrada). Videnskabelige Meddelelser fra Dansk Naturhistorisk Forening, vol. 145, p. 201-218.

Halechiniscidae
Tardigrade genera